"Loneliness" is a short-story by Charles Bukowski collected in his 1973 collection South of No North, originally published by John Martin's Black Sparrow Press. It's the first short-story of the book.

Plot
A lonely middle-aged woman responds to a personal ad, but the man who posted it, overwhelmed by lust, will not take things in moderation, and their date goes very badly.

See also

Charles Bukowski
South of No North

References

Works by Charles Bukowski
1973 short stories